Polšeče is a small settlement in the hills north of Ravnik in the Municipality of Bloke in the Inner Carniola region of Slovenia.

References

External links

Polšeče on Geopedia

Populated places in the Municipality of Bloke